Britten is a surname, originally referring to a person from Brittany. Notable people with the surname include:

 Benjamin Britten (1913–1976), British composer, conductor, and pianist
 Bill Britten, American actor best known for his portrayal of Bozo the Clown
 Emma Hardinge Britten (1823–1899), spiritualist
 Frederick A. Britten (1871–1946), U.S. Representative from Illinois
 Harry Britten (1870–1954), English entomologist
 James Britten (1846–1925), English botanist
 John Britten (1950–1995), New Zealand motorcycle designer
 Linda Britten, Australian fashion designer
 Mark Britten, American comedian with stage name "The Chinaman"
 Paul Britten Austin, English author, broadcaster and translator 
 Rhonda Britten (born 1960), founder of the Fearless Living Institute
 Roy John Britten (born 1919), American molecular biologist 
 Sébastien Britten (born 1970), Canadian figure skater
 Terry Britten, English singer-songwriter
 Simon Britten, Consultant Trauma & Orthopaedic Surgeon, Leeds (1966-       )

See also 
 Britton (surname)

English-language surnames
Ethnonymic surnames